Helle Bonnesen (born 10 February 1963) is a Danish politician serving as Member of the Folketing for the Conservative People's Party since 2022.

Career 
Bonnesen was elected to the Folketing at the 2022 Danish general election with 2,783 personal votes.

References 

1963 births
Conservative People's Party (Denmark) politicians
Members of the Folketing 2022–2026
Living people